Marwan M. Kraidy is the Dean of Northwestern University in Qatar. He is a former Professor of Communication at the Annenberg School for Communication at the University of Pennsylvania. Kraidy is the Anthony Shadid Chair in Global Media, Politics and Cultures and the Founding Director of the Center for Advanced Research in Global Communication (CARGC). Kraidy's focus is on the relationship between culture and geopolitics, global mass media systems and industries, and theories of modernity and identity. Kraidy is also an Andrew Carnegie Fellow.

References

External links 
 Center for Advanced Research in Global Communication (CARGC)

University of Pennsylvania faculty
Year of birth missing (living people)
Living people